Akhmad Gasbullayevich Magomedov (born 10 August 1989) is a Russian former footballer.

Career
Anisimov made his professional debut for Anzhi Makhachkala on 14 July 2010 in the Russian Cup game against FC Pskov-747.

External links
 
 
 

1989 births
Living people
Russian footballers
Association football defenders
FC Anzhi Makhachkala players
Russian people of Dagestani descent
FC Chayka Peschanokopskoye players